Acromantis philippina, common name Philippines acromantis, is a species of praying mantis native to the Philippines.

See also
List of mantis genera and species

References

Philippina
Mantodea of Southeast Asia
Endemic fauna of the Philippines
Insects of the Philippines
Insects described in 1966